General elections were held in Lesotho on 25 May 2002. The result was a victory for the Lesotho Congress for Democracy, which took over 50% of the vote and 77 of the 120 seats in the National Assembly. It was the first election held in Lesotho under the mixed member proportional representation (MMP) system, with 80 seats elected in first-past-the-post constituencies, and 40 using a proportional representation-based compensatory system. 554,386 of the 831,515 registered voters cast valid votes.

Results

References

Elections in Lesotho
Lesotho
2002 in Lesotho
Election and referendum articles with incomplete results
May 2002 events in Africa